The Quileute Indian Reservation is an Indian reservation for the Quileute people located on the northwestern Olympic Peninsula in Clallam County, Washington, United States. The reservation is at the mouth of the Quillayute River on the Pacific coast.

The Quileute people settled onto the Quileute Indian Reservation after signing the Quinault Treaty in 1855. La Push, Washington is the reservation's main population center. The 2000 census reported an official resident population of 371 people on the reservation, which has a land area of 4.061 km2 (1.5678 sq mi, or 1,003.4 acres).

In 1966, James Island was removed from surrounding Quillayute Needles National Wildlife Refuge by the U.S. Department of the Interior, and returned to the Quileute when the island was discovered to be part of the Quileute Indian Reservation. In the 2000s, the tribal government petitioned the U.S. government for other land transfers, in particular to rebuild homes away from the coastline's tsunami hazard zone.

The Quileute have their own government, consisting of a tribal council with staggered terms. The current tribal council consists of: Carol Hatch (chair), Tony Foster (vice-chair), DeAnna Hobson (secretary), and Anna Rose Counsell (treasurer).

References

External links
 Quileute Nation

Quileute
Geography of Clallam County, Washington
American Indian reservations in Washington (state)